Hittite plague was an epidemic of tularemia (also known colloquially as rabbit fever) which occurred in the 14th century BC. The Hittite plague was also used in what is considered the first documented use of a disease as a biological weapon.

Background 
The Hittite Empire stretched from Turkey to Syria. The plague was an outbreak of Francisella tularensis which occurred along the Arwad-Euphrates trading route in the 14th century BC. Much of the Middle East suffered from outbreaks; however, Egypt and Assyria initiated a quarantine along their border, and they did not experience the epidemic.

Tularemia is a bacterial infection which is still a threat. It is also referred to as "rabbit fever" and it is a zoonotic disease which can easily pass from animals to humans. The most common way that it is spread is through various insects which hop between species, such as ticks. The symptoms of an infection range from skin lesions to respiratory failure. Without treatment the mortality rate is fifteen percent of those infected. According to former microbiologist Siro Trevisanato, "Tularemia is rare in many countries today, but remains a problem in some countries including Bulgaria."

Epidemic 

According to author Philip Norrie (How Disease Affected the End of the Bronze Age), there are three diseases most likely to have caused a post-Bronze Age societal collapse: smallpox, bubonic plague and tularemia. The tularemia plague which struck the Hittites could have been spread by insects or infected dirt or plants, through open wounds, or by eating infected animals.

Hittite texts from the mid-14th century BC refer to the plague causing disabilities and death. Hittite King Muršili II wrote prayers seeking relief from the epidemic, which had lasted two decades and killed many of his subjects. The two kings who preceded him, Šuppiluliuma I and Šuppiluliuma's immediate heir, Arnuwanda II, had also succumbed to tularemia. Muršili had ascended to the throne because he was the last surviving son of Šuppiluliuma.

Muršili believed that the plague had been transmitted to the Hittites by Egyptian prisoners who had been paraded through the capital city, Hattusha. There is some evidence suggesting that the Egyptians suffered from tularemia in the years preceding 1322. The Hittites apparently also suspected zoonotic transmission, because they banned the use of donkeys in caravans. Another theory of the plague's origin suggests that it originated with rams that the Hittites had taken as spoils of war, along with other animals, after the Hittites raided Simyra. Soon after the animals were brought into Hittite villages, the tularemia outbreak began.

Plague as a weapon 
The disease was intentionally brought to Anatolia in what historians describe as the "first known record of biological warfare". Shortly after the Hittites experienced the outbreak of disease, the Arzawans from western Anatolia believed the Hittites were weakened and attacked them. The Arzawans claimed that rams suddenly appeared (1320 and 1318 BC) and the Arzawans brought them into their villages. It is thought that the Hittites had sent rams diseased with tularemia to infect their enemies. The Arzawans became so weakened by the plague that they failed in their attempt to conquer the Hittites.

References 

Hittite Empire
Hittite plague
Biological warfare
Epidemics